BPFC may refer to:
 Big Players FC, a sporting club in St. Lucia
 Birkenhead Park FC, a rugby club founded in 1871 in Birkenhead, Wirral, United Kingdom